is an urban expressway in Nagoya and Komaki, Aichi, Japan. It is a part of the Nagoya Expressway network and is owned and operated by Nagoya Expressway Public Corporation.

Overview

The route is a northward extension of Route 1 which terminates at its junction with the Higashi-Meihan Expressway. Route 11 continues as an elevated expressway above the median of National Route 41. The terminus is at Komaki-kita Interchange, which also provides direct access to the Meishin Expressway and Tōmei Expressway

The expressway is 4 lanes for its entire length and was opened to traffic in 2001. The toll is 350 yen for passenger cars and light trucks (including 2-wheeled vehicles) and 700 yen for large trucks and buses.

Electronic Toll Collection (ETC) is not accepted at the entrance of Horinouchi Interchange. However, the toll at this entrance is only 200 yen for passenger cars. The same discounted toll applies to vehicles entering or exiting the route from Toyoyama-minami Interchange at the southern end of the route, however these toll booths accept ETC.

Interchange list

 JCT - junction, TB - toll gate

References

External links
 Nagoya Expressway Public Corporation

Nagoya Expressway